Vertente do Lério is a municipality/city in the state of Pernambuco in Brazil. The population in 2020, according with IBGE was 7,571 inhabitants and the total area is 73.63 km2.

Geography

 State - Pernambuco
 Region - Agreste of Pernambuco
 Boundaries - Paraiba state   (N);  Surubim   (S);  Casinhas   (E);   Santa Maria do Cambucá  (W).
 Area - 67.07 km2
 Elevation - 290 m
 Hydrography - Capibaribe River
 Vegetation - Caatinga hiperxerófila
 Climate  -  semi arid hot
 Annual average temperature - 24.4 c
 Distance to Recife - 143 km

Economy

The main economic activities in Vertentes do Lério are related with mineral extraction industry and agribusiness, especially creations of cattle, sheep, goats and chickens.

Economic Indicators

Economy by Sector

2006

Health Indicators

References

Municipalities in Pernambuco